Charles Williams (born 16 March 1965) is a British artist. He is a founding member of the Stuckist art group and a member of the New English Art Club.

Life and work
Charles Williams was born in Evanston, Illinois, USA, and raised in England. He was educated at Kent College in Canterbury, Maidstone College of Art and the Royal Academy, London, where in 1992 he won the top prize for painting as well as the prize for anatomical drawing.

In 1996, he was elected to the New English Art Club (NEAC) with whom he regularly exhibits in the Mall Galleries in London. He has shown in London galleries since 1992, and in 2004 he had a solo exhibition at the Bakersfield Museum Of Art in California, as well as showing in many major competitive exhibitions in London, the UK and abroad, including the Threadneedle Prize for figurative painting, the Marmite Prize and the Hunting Prize. He is also a member of the RWS.

In 1999, along with fellow artist Eamon Everall, he became one of the 12 original founder members of Stuckism, the radical anti-conceptual art movement. Williams exhibited regularly with the Stuckists, was a joint winner of their Real Turner Prize 2002, and was a featured artist in the major show, The Stuckists Punk Victorian, at the Walker Art Gallery, during the 2004 Liverpool Biennial.

Williams' paintings use a narrative content to give a sense of the wider concerns of his subjects.

His book, Basic Drawing (pub. Robert Hale), summing up his teaching methods, was published in September 2011, and the follow-up, "Basic Watercolour" was published in 2014.

Williams teaches in the Painting School of Canterbury Christchurch University Fine and Applied Art degree course in his native Canterbury.

See also

Stuckism
New English Art Club

References

Sources
 Ed. Katherine Evans (2000), The Stuckists, Victoria Press, 
 Ed. Frank Milner (2004), The Stuckists Punk Victorian, National Museums Liverpool, 

www.unclecharles.co.uk

External links
 Charles Williams paintings

Stuckism
20th-century British painters
British male painters
21st-century British painters
Artists from Evanston, Illinois
1965 births
Living people
Alumni of the University for the Creative Arts
English contemporary artists
20th-century British male artists
21st-century British male artists